Trans is a village in the municipality of Tomils in the district of Hinterrhein in the Swiss canton of Graubünden.  In 2009 Trans merged with Feldis/Veulden, Scheid and Tumegl/Tomils to form the municipality of Tomils.

History
Trans is first mentioned in the middle of the 12th Century as Hof ad Tranne.

Geography
Of this area, 30.2% is used for agricultural purposes, while 46.4% is forested. Of the rest of the land, 1.3% is settled (buildings or roads) and the remainder (22%) is non-productive (rivers, glaciers or mountains).

The municipality is located in the Domleschg sub-district, of the Hinterrhein district.

Demographics
Trans has a population of 56, all Swiss.  Over the last 10 years the population has decreased at a rate of -17.6%.

, the gender distribution of the population was 55.4% male and 44.6% female.  The age distribution, in Trans is; 8 people or 11.6% of the population are between 0 and 9 years old.  6 people or 8.7% are 10 to 14, and 4 people or 5.8% are 15 to 19.  Of the adult population, 5 people or 7.2% of the population are between 20 and 29 years old.  7 people or 10.1% are 30 to 39, 11 people or 15.9% are 40 to 49, and 12 people or 17.4% are 50 to 59.  The senior population distribution is 5 people or 7.2% of the population are between 60 and 69 years old, 4 people or 5.8% are 70 to 79, there are 7 people or 10.1% who are 80 to 89.

In the 2007 federal election the most popular party was the SVP which received 66.9% of the vote.  The next three most popular parties were the SPS (17.9%), the FDP (9%) and the CVP (4.8%).

The entire Swiss population is generally well educated.  In Trans about 52.8% of the population (between age 25-64) have completed either non-mandatory upper secondary education or additional higher education (either University or a Fachhochschule).

Trans has an unemployment rate of 0%.  , there were 15 people employed in the primary economic sector and about 7 businesses involved in this sector.  4 people are employed in the secondary sector and there are 2 businesses in this sector.  4 people are employed in the tertiary sector, with 2 businesses in this sector.

The historical population is given in the following table:

References

External links

 Official website 
 

Former municipalities of Graubünden
Domleschg